Lexington is a former Rochester Industrial and Rapid Transit Railway station located in Rochester, New York. It was closed in 1956 along with the rest of the line.

References

Railway stations in Rochester, New York
Railway stations in the United States opened in 1918
Railway stations closed in 1956
1918 establishments in New York (state)
1956 disestablishments in New York (state)